West Virginia Route 5 is an east–west state highway located in northwest West Virginia. The western terminus is at West Virginia Route 14 in Elizabeth, Wirt County. The eastern terminus is at U.S. Route 19 and West Virginia Route 4 in Heaters, Braxton County four miles (6 km) north of Interstate 79 exit 67. Almost all of WV 5 parallels the Little Kanawha River.

Originally, the eastern terminus began  further north along US 19/WV 4 at Napier, but this part of the route became one of West Virginia's unused highways when it was closed in the mid-1970s to make way for Burnsville Lake.

Major intersections

References

005
West Virginia Route 005
West Virginia Route 005
West Virginia Route 005
West Virginia Route 005